Jeffrey L. Kirk (October 25, 1923 – February 20, 1976) was an American hurdler. He competed in the men's 400 metres hurdles at the 1948 Summer Olympics. He was educated at Mercersburg Academy, where he trained under Jimmy Curran, and the University of Pennsylvania, where he trained under Lawson Robertson. After graduation he worked as an educator at Kimberton Farms School, Lehigh University and Adelphi University.

References

External links
 

1923 births
1976 deaths
Athletes (track and field) at the 1948 Summer Olympics
American male hurdlers
Olympic track and field athletes of the United States
Place of birth missing